Houruiyeh (also Romanized as Ḩūrū’īyeh) is a village in Deh Bakri Rural District, in the Central District of Bam County, Kerman Province, Iran. At the 2016 census, its population was 6.

References 

Populated places in Bam County